Flag is an encaustic painting by the American artist Jasper Johns. Created when Johns was 24 (1954–55), two years after he was discharged from the US Army, this painting was the first of many works that Johns has said were inspired by a dream of the U.S. flag in 1954. It is arguably the painting for which Johns is best known.

Description

It is made using encaustic, oil paint, and newsprint collage on three separate canvases, mounted on a plywood board. The painting reflects the three colors of the US flag: red, white and blue; the flag is depicted in the form it took between 1912 and 1959, with 48 white stars on a blue canton representing the then-US states (excluding Alaska and Hawaii), and with thirteen red and white stripes. Newsprint is visible under the stripes. Reading the texts, it is clear that the newsprint was not selected at random: Johns steered clear of headlines, or national or political news, and used inconsequential articles or adverts. The painting has a rough-textured surface, and the 48 stars are not identical. It is dated 1954 on its reverse.

Flag series
Johns made over 40 works based on the US flag, including the large and monochrome White Flag in 1955, and his 1958 work Three Flags with three superimposed flags showing a total of 84 stars.

His 48-star Flag from 1958 was purchased in 2010 by hedge fund manager Steven A. Cohen for an estimated $110 million, making it the most expensive work sold by a living artist as of 2023.

In November 2014, the encaustic Flag (1983) was auctioned off for $36 million at Sotheby's in New York City.

References

Further reading 
 American Culture in The 1950s Martin Halliwell, p. 203–205
 https://web.archive.org/web/20120622185114/http://edu.warhol.org/app_johns.html
 Figuring Jasper Johns, Fred Orton, p. 89–146
 Made in U.S.A.: An Americanization in Modern Art, the '50s and '60s, Sidra Stich, p. 19
 The Target: Alain Robbe-Grillet, Jasper Johns, Ben Stoltzfus, p. 80–81

External links 
 Flag, Museum of Modern Art
 Jasper Johns (born 1930), Metropolitan Museum of Art

1954 paintings
Paintings by Jasper Johns
Paintings in the collection of the Museum of Modern Art (New York City)
Flags in art
Flags of the United States